SSCP may refer to:

 Systems Security Certified Practitioner, an IT Security certification offered by (ISC)²
 Single strand conformation polymorphism in molecular biology
 Sums of squares and cross products in statistics
 Sethusamudram shipping canal project
 Summary of safety and clinical performance for medical devices